Cindytalk is an experimental music project, founded in 1982. Cindytalk operated as a group for many years, but more recently has been a solo project by Cinder (previously known as Gordon Sharp), a Scottish performer and the only constant member since 1982.

1982–2003
Cindytalk was formed in 1982 by Cinder (vocals) and David Clancy (guitar, keyboards) from the ashes of Edinburgh-based punk/new wave band The Freeze.

After re-locating to London in 1982, Cindytalk began to work towards their debut album Camouflage Heart, with a darker and more fractured sound that drew much from post-punk and early European industrial music. In 1983 Cinder and Clancy were joined by John Byrne who proved to be a crucial component in Cindytalk's deliberately disintegrating sound.

The album Camouflage Heart appeared to some critical acclaim in the UK music press. Shortly after Camouflage Heart, David Clancy left the band and was replaced by brother/sister team Alex and Debbie Wright. The colossal In This World was recorded over the next three years: two albums of the same name released simultaneously, featuring cover art by Kathy Patterson. The first of the albums, a broken and noisy affair, the second, an album of creaky ambience featuring Cinder's improvised piano experiments. In This World also featured an uncredited collaboration with feminist punk writer Kathy Acker (Janey's Love).

During this period Cindytalk had also begun working in tandem with performance artist and film maker Ivan Unwin, providing sound for some of her short pieces. This led Cindytalk to scoring Unwin's "Eclipse: An Amateur Enthusiasts Guide to Virus Deployment", the record of which was released on Midnight Music in 1990 under the title The Wind Is Strong..., the album, following on from the second of the In This World albums, was based on piano improvisations and abstract/concrete experiments. At the time Cinder described it as "Ambi-dustrial" fusing her love of the early ambient releases on the EG label with the above-mentioned European Industrial music. Cinder was joined on this release by Ivan Unwin and long standing co-producer/engineer David Ros who then became a more active member of the band. Matt Kinnison and drummer/percussionist Paul Middleton also provided sounds and ideas to this mix. Secrets And Falling, a 4-track e.p. culled from the Wappinschaw sessions was released in 1991. At this point the band had become more of a collective, drawing on musicians from the current line-up as well as the past, John Byrne returned and was joined by Kevin Rich and Darryl Moore (Soul Static Sound).

Midnight Music folded in 1992 and prevented the recently finished album Wappinschaw from being released until 1995 (on Cinder's own label Touched, distributed through World Serpent). Wappinschaw features a collaboration with Scottish artist and writer Alasdair Gray, who reads from his novel "Lanark" (Wheesht).

By 1993, Cindytalk had gone through more changes and was preparing to play live for the first time. Cinder, Middleton and Ros were joined by Paul Jones, Andie Brown, Mark Stephenson and Simon Carmichael to record and release 1994's "Muster"/"Prince of Lies" 7" (Touched/World Serpent).

In early 1996, Cindytalk toured the US. They played two shows in Boston – one a "secret" show at the start of their tour under the name "Lucinder", and one at the end. In between, they played Washington DC, Cleveland, Detroit, Minneapolis, Portland OR, Seattle, Santa Clara, San Francsisco, Corona CA, Tempe AZ, Baton Rouge, Atlanta, Orlando, Miami, Charlotte NC and New York City. Bowery Electric and Trance to the Sun were opening acts at multiple dates.

In 2007, Cindytalk signed a licensing deal with Italian distributors Abraxas through a sub-label Wheesht, who were to re-issue the back catalogue up to Wappinschaw. However, this deal appears to have gone awry with Abraxas releasing the first two Cindytalk albums Camouflage Heart and In This World without complying with the contract. In 2021, Dais Records (USA) re-issued The Wind Is Strong... and Wappinschaw.

2003 to present
2003's Klang Galerie 7" release "Transgender Warrior/Guts of London" saw Cindytalk move into more abstract areas, taking a closer look at the rhythms, tones and melodies of noise.

Since 2004, Cinder has split her time between Japan and the UK, working on various projects. This has included Cindytalk performing live (solo or group), and a number of (mostly solo) recordings.

Most notably, Vienna-based label Editions Mego have released a series of Cindytalk albums, mostly comprising solo work by Cinder: The Crackle of My Soul (2009), Up Here in the Clouds (2010), Hold Everything Dear (2011), and A Life Is Everywhere (repast) (2013). A vinyl double album The Poetry of Decay collects both The Crackle of My Soul and Up Here in the Clouds (2010). A 10-inch vinyl split release in tandem with Robert Hampson was released in 2010, featuring Cindytalk's "Five Mountains of Fire" and Robert Hampson's "Antarctica Ends Here".

In the summer of 2005, Cindytalk was invited to use tracks from The Crackle of My Soul as musical score for the UK independent film Madrigal (Rabblewise Films).

In summer 2006, based in London, Cindytalk started working on a new (band) album provisionally entitled In A World Without Hope. In Spring 2011, Jacob Burns of Lata (and former bass player with Scottish band Damn Shames) joined Cindytalk on electronics. Cindytalk were invited by Ray Davies of The Kinks to play at the Meltdown Festival on London's Southbank (June 2011).

The Indiana-based label BlueSanct released a Cindytalk 10" called Silver Shoals of Light as part of their 10-year anniversary limited edition ART SINGLES club. Recorded 2006; released 2008.

Matt Kinnison died from cancer on Wednesday 7 May 2008.

Handmade Birds announced a new Cindytalk album for summer 2014 entitled touchedRAWKISSEDsour.

In 2014, they played the BBC Tectonics festival, sharing a billing with Thurston Moore.

Of Ghosts and Buildings (2021) was released on the Japanese label Remodel, and Subterminal (2022) on the UK label False Walls, both continuing Cinder's integration of electronics with field recordings.

Side/related projects
In 1983, Cinder recorded a John Peel session with fellow Scots Cocteau Twins (contributing to "Hazel" and "Dear Heart", available on some versions of Garlands as well as BBC Sessions) which led to a meeting with 4AD founder Ivo Watts-Russell who invited her to appear on This Mortal Coil's 1983 debut EP Sixteen Days/Gathering Dust. She was also one of three featured singers on the debut This Mortal Coil album It'll End in Tears (1984), contributing vocals to "Kangaroo" (which was released as a single and became an instant indie hit), "Fond Affections" and "A Single Wish".

An electronic side-project, Bambule, was started in 1994 by Cinder and Carmichael, inspired by underground techno parties such as Dead By Dawn and VFM. Carmichael left the band on the eve of Cindytalk's extensive US tour (1996) and by the time the first Bambule record was ready Carmichael had taken control of the project and its connection to Cindytalk had receded. London's Praxis label released the 8-track vinyl double-pack (originally titled "Songs From The Motherbomb" ) as Cunning Meets Bambule (Praxis 19). Bambule followed this up in 2000 with a 4-track 12" called "Vertical Invasion" (Praxis 29) which featured Cinder alongside new Cindytalk cohort Richie Young, Tymothi Loving and Dale Lloyd & Stuart Arentzen from Seattle band Lucid (both Cinder and Young would also collaborate with Lucid's alter-ego After The Flood on tracks for the ATF2 release). The Vertical Invasion 12" also, included two remixes by Welsh electronic wizards Somatic Responses (as Photon Emissions). By this time Cinder had moved to the U.S. and had become involved with various techno collectives (ele_mental in Columbus, Ohio, Candlelight (with DJ Deadly Buda) and Darkmatter Sound System in Los Angeles). As of 2010, Cinder still used the Bambule moniker for occasional DJing purposes.

Discography
Albums
Camouflage Heart (1984) (UK Indie #22)
In This World (1988)
The Wind Is Strong... (1990)
Wappinschaw (1995)
The Crackle of My Soul (2009)
Up Here in the Clouds (2010)
The Poetry of Decay (2010)
Hold Everything Dear (2011)
A Life Is Everywhere (2013)
touchedRAWKISSEDsour (2014)
The Labyrinth of the Straight Line (2016)
Of Ghosts and Buildings (2021)
Subterminal (2022)

Singles
"Secrets and Falling" (1991)
"Prince of Lies" (1993)
"Transgender Warrior" (2003)
"Silver Shoals of Light" (2008)
"Five Mountains of Fire" (2010)

Other contributions
"Playtime" – Abstract Magazine Issue 5 LP on Sweatbox Records (1985)
"Splinter and Move" – Between Today and Tomorrow LP on Midnight Music (1986)
"Empty Hand" – Sound From Hands CD on Minus Habens Records (1992)
"This Salt Heals All My Wounds" – Dreaming Out Loud: Emigre Music Sampler No. 3 CD on Emigre Records (1994)
"Sentinel" – Extreme Electronics and Splintered Beats Mix CD on Darkmatter Soundsystem (2003)
"Canto" & "Surrounded By Sky and the Stillness of Time" – Ruines & Vanités CD on Meidosem Records/Trinity Magazine (2007)
"A Distant Kite" – Twelve-Foot Wize CD on Bluesanct (2010)
"A Question of Re-Entry" – A duo with Phillipe Petit, Lumberton Trading Company (017) (2011)
"In the Mouth of the Wolf" – a project with Ancient Methods on Jaime Williams and Powell's label Diaganol (2016)

References

External links
 Official Cindytalk website
 "Of ghosts and buildings", Cindytalk blog
 Cindytalk Myspace page
 Discogs entry for Cindytalk
 Editions Mego website, Cindytalk page
 Remembering the Freeze with Cinder of Cindytalk
 False Walls website, Cindytalk album release page

Scottish rock music groups
British experimental musical groups
Scottish post-punk music groups
Musical groups established in 1982
4AD artists
1982 establishments in Scotland